Kumla Church (Swedish: Kumla kyrka) is a limestone church, built in the 12th century. It is located at the lake Tåkern in Kumla socken in Mjölby Municipality in Östergötland, Sweden.

External links
http://www.lansstyrelsen.se/ostergotland/SiteCollectionDocuments/sv/samhallsplanering-och-kulturmiljo/skyddad-bebyggelse/kyrkliga-kulturminnen/Kumlakyrka.pdf

Buildings and structures in Östergötland County
Churches in the Diocese of Linköping
12th-century churches in Sweden